Nosophora glyphodalis is a moth in the family Crambidae. It was described by Francis Walker in 1866. It is found in Indonesia, where it has been recorded from the Sula Islands.

References

Moths described in 1866
Spilomelinae
Moths of Indonesia